Keroun Bazar is a village in Ward 2 of the Kanepokhari Rural Municipality of the Morang District in Province No. 1 of south-eastern Nepal. 
Keroun was formerly a Village development committee (VDC), but was incorporated into Kanepokhari when that rural municipality was created in 2017.

Location

The Keroun VDC was in Nepal, Eastern Region, Kosī Zone, Morang.
Google Maps shows Keroun Bazar on the Kanepokhari-Rangeli road to the north of Daleli and the south of Ramailo.

References

Kanepokhari Rural Municipality